Wendy Newman (born 1967) is an American relationship expert, professional workshop leader, and author. Her relationship advice, often with other experts in the field, has been published in the Wall Street Journal, U.S. News & World Report, Salon magazine, Yahoo! Health, and Bustle magazine. Newman leads a variety of self-improvement workshops; her guidance is based upon her research which started in 2002 and continues today. Her freshman novel, 121 First Dates, details her personal experiences with dates, dating websites and ultimately finding her life partner.

Life and career
Newman was born and raised in Salt Lake City, Utah and became a hotelier in 1986. In 1987 she relocated to San Francisco and for much of the 1990s, she was the general manager of Mary Elizabeth Inn, an 88-room residence for disenfranchised women. In the early 2000s, she incubated an Internet start-up, StaySonoma.com, a lodging accommodations company she sold in 2012.

Newman has been employed by PAX Programs since 2002, and has led over one hundred relationship workshops since 2006. She received a certificate in American Sign Language (ASL) and Deaf Culture Studies from Vista Community College, Berkeley, California (1997).

121 First Dates
Newman's blogging, which ultimately became 121 First Dates, began with "Date #54 - Keeping Up With Mr. Johnson" on May 8, 2010. Sharing her experiences with family and friends, she continued blogging, reasoning if she didn't end up with a partner, perhaps she might end up with a book. Her calendar contained the 53 earlier dates which she wrote from memory. The working title of the book at that time was, 101 First Dates: A Survival Guide For The Single Girl; Newman met her husband, Dave Pierce, on her 121st first date. A completed manuscript was already in editing at the time of meeting Pierce and was then rewritten from the perspective of a woman now in a committed relationship. Twenty-eight, first-date short-stories are included in 121 First Dates: How to Succeed at Online Dating, Fall in Love, and Live Happily Ever After (Really!).

Newman decided against self-publishing 121 First Dates. In connection with the publication, Newman has been interviewed by, Access Hollywood (NBC), the Wall Street Journal, the Washington Post (reprinted Chicago Tribune), The Huffington Post, Self magazine (reprinted in Glamor), and  The Daily Free Press 

121 First Dates has been reviewed by, Library Journal, Publishers Weekly, and Metro International.

References

External links 
 

1967 births
Living people
Writers from San Francisco
American health and wellness writers
American women non-fiction writers
American relationships and sexuality writers
American advice columnists
American women columnists
21st-century American women